The Chitimacha Louisiana Open was a golf tournament on the Korn Ferry Tour from 1992 to 2022. It was played annually at Le Triomphe Golf and Country Club in Broussard, Louisiana.

The 2022 purse was $750,000, with $135,000 going to the winner.

Winners

Bolded golfers graduated to the PGA Tour via the Korn Ferry Tour regular-season money list.

Notes

See also
Louisiana State Open

References

External links

Coverage on the Korn Ferry Tour's official site
Le Triomphe Golf and Country Club

Former Korn Ferry Tour events
Golf in Louisiana
Sports in Lafayette, Louisiana
Recurring sporting events established in 1992
Recurring sporting events disestablished in 2022
1992 establishments in Louisiana
2022 disestablishments in Louisiana